Pulsed field gel electrophoresis is a technique used for the separation of large DNA molecules by applying to a gel matrix an electric field that periodically changes direction. Pulsed-field gel electrophoresis (PFGE) is a method used to separate large segments of DNA using an alternating and cross field. In a uniform magnetic field, components larger than 50kb move through the gel in a zigzag pattern, allowing for more effective separation of DNA molecules. This method is commonly used in microbiology for typing bacteria and is a valuable tool for epidemiological studies and gene mapping in microbes and mammalian cells. It also played a role in the development of large-insert cloning systems such as bacterial and yeast artificial chromosomes.

PFGE can be used to determine the genetic similarity between bacteria, as close and similar species will have similar profiles while dissimilar ones will have different profiles. This feature is useful in identifying the prevalent agent of a disease. Additionally, it can be used to monitor and evaluate micro-organisms in clinical samples, soil and water. It is also considered a reliable and standard method in vaccine preparation. In recent years, PFGE has been widely used as a powerful tool for controlling, preventing and monitoring diseases in different populations

Discovery
The discovery of PFGE can be traced back to the late 1970s and early 1980s.One of the earliest references to the use of PFGE for DNA analysis is a 1977 paper by Dr. David Burke and colleagues at the University of Colorado, where they described a method of separating DNA molecules based on their size using conventional gel electrophoresis. The first reference to the use of the term "pulsed-field gel electrophoresis" appears in a 1983 paper by Dr. Richard L. Sweeley and colleagues at the DuPont Company, where they described a method of separating large DNA molecules (over 50 kb) by applying a series of alternating electric fields to a gel matrix. In the following years, several groups of scientists improved and fine-tuned the technique, including Dr. J. Peter Gerhardt and colleagues at the University of Alabama in Birmingham in 1984, and Dr. Mark Scherer and colleagues at the University of Minnesota in 1986. By the late 1980s and early 1990s, PFGE had become a widely used technique for the separation and analysis of large DNA molecules in various fields of research, including molecular biology, genetics, and biotechnology.

PFGE Types 
There are various types of PFGE methods, such as FIGE, TAFE, CHEF, OFAG, PHOGE and PACE, that are used for isolating and typing DNA with large pieces. The choice of which method to use depends on the financial resources available and the specific goals of the study.

Field-Inversion Gel Electrophoresis (FIG) 
This is a technique that separates large segments of DNA by periodically flipping two fields at a straight angle. The movement of DNA molecules is facilitated by shorter time pulses or less force in the reverse direction. This method, first introduced by Carle, Frank and Olson in 1986, is known for its ease of use and popularity in separating smaller parts of DNA. It provides acceptable resolution of over 800 Kb. However, the movement of DNA molecules larger than 2mb may not be consistent and molecules of different sizes and labels may move and migrate together in FIGE.

Orthogonal-Field Alternation Gel Electrophoresis (OFAGE) 
This system is a laboratory technique developed by Clark and Olsen in 1984.  OFAGE uses non-uniform electric fields to separate large DNA fragments. This can cause variations in the migration of DNA throughout the gel, making it challenging to distinguish and map the different components of the genome, particularly in mammalian cells. The angle between the electric fields can vary, with a range between less than 180 degrees and more than 90 degrees. Despite this limitation, DNA molecules between 1000 kb and 2000 kb can still be separated using this method.

Asymmetric Field Inversion Gel Electrophoresis (AFIGE) 
This is a method for detecting DNA double-strand breaks (DSBs) using a reverse-asymmetrical field gel electrophoresis. The technique involves extracting DNA from cells, fixing it in agarose plugs, and transferring them into the AFIGE system. The rate of DNA breakage is then measured under an inverted and asymmetric electric field, allowing for quantitative measurement. This method involves exposing the DNA to restriction endonucleases, such as Xhol, for a longer period of time, resulting in an increase in the number of fractures. It is specific for detecting double-stranded DNA.

Clamped Homogeneous Electric Field (CHEF) 
This system is a widely used method for pulsed-field gel electrophoresis. It was developed by Clark et al. and creates distortion on the edge of the chamber and passive electrodes using a complex method. This allows for automatic control of the electrodes and a hexagonal arrangement of 24 electrodes. Unlike other systems, CHEF does not use non-passive electrodes, and all electrodes are connected to the power supply through a series of identical ring resistors. These rings regulate the voltage on all electrodes, creating a unit electric field. The CHEF system voltage is set at 24 points and uses a 120 degree angle orientation from the positive electrode to the negative electrode. This system can separate molecules over 7000 kb in size. The precision in controlling the size, location, coordination, stability and continuity of the electric field allows for the separation of DNA fragments of different sizes.

Programmable Autonomously-Controlled Electrodes(PACE)

The PACE electrophoresis system is a highly efficient and flexible method for DNA separation. It utilizes 24 electrodes arranged in a closed contour and allows for independent adjustment of voltage, giving complete control over all parameters of the electric field. The system can produce an unlimited number of controlled homogeneous electric fields, voltage gradients, flow direction and duration, making it superior to other methods such as FIGE, OFAG, and PHOGE. The PACE system can separate DNA fragments from 100 bp to more than 6Mb and its ability to change the angle among the reorientation of alternating currents increases the speed of separation for large DNA molecules. It's the best option for reliable and efficient DNA separation.

Rotating Gel Electrophoresis (RGE)

The Southern method, introduced in 1987, is a technique used for DNA separation. It involves rotating a gel between two angles while the power supply is turned off. The method, also known as Rotating Gel Electrophoresis (RGE), utilizes a monotonous electric field and direct separation is achieved through the use of a single set of electrodes. The rotation of the gel allows for an increased intensity of voltage to be applied, resulting in a shorter isolation time. Additionally, the angle of rotation can easily be adjusted to suit the specific needs of the separation. This method is considered easy to use and is suitable for DNA with a size range of 50 to 6000 Kb.

Pulsed-Homogeneous Orthogonal Field Gel Electrophoresis (PHOGE)

The 90 degree angle orientation method, also known as Pulsed Field Gel Electrophoresis (PFGE), stands out from other methods of PFGE that utilize homogeneous fields. This system utilizes an orientation angle of 90 degrees, resulting in DNA molecules being moved four times per cycle instead of the standard two. The use of multiple electric fields also causes DNA lines to not follow a straight line, making this method even more effective. This system is specifically designed to separate DNA fragments larger than 1Mb, making it a powerful tool for larger DNA analysis.

Protocol 

The protocol typically involves the following steps:

 Preparing the agarose gel: An agarose gel is prepared by mixing agarose powder with TBE buffer and heating the mixture to dissolve the agarose. Agarose is a polysaccharide that forms a gel when it is dissolved in a buffer and solidified. TBE buffer (Tris-Borate-EDTA) is commonly used in PFGE as it helps to maintain the integrity of the DNA during electrophoresis. The gel is poured into a casting tray and allowed to solidify. Once solidified, the gel is inserted into the electrophoresis chamber.
 Loading the DNA sample: The DNA sample is digested with a restriction enzyme to generate a set of fragments of known size. Restriction enzymes are enzymes that cut DNA at specific sequences. The fragments are then loaded onto the gel, typically in a well that is created by punching a hole in the gel. This well is used to load the sample and the sample will be separated by different fragment size in the gel
 Running the electrophoresis: The gel is placed in the electrophoresis chamber, which is filled with TBE buffer. A pulsed electric field is applied to the gel, which causes the DNA fragments to migrate through the gel. The time of the electrophoresis is generally between 18 to 48 hours. The principle of this electrophoresis is that DNA fragments will move in the gel under an electric field and migrate towards the anode. Larger DNA fragments will move more slowly than smaller ones, allowing them to be separated by size 
 Staining the gel: Once the electrophoresis is complete, the gel is removed from the chamber and stained with a DNA-specific stain, such as ethidium bromide. Ethidium bromide is a fluorescent dye that intercalates into DNA and causes the DNA to fluoresce when exposed to UV light. The stained gel is then visualized under UV light to identify the DNA bands. The final gel will show different bands of different size, the bigger band is representing larger fragment size.

Applications

PFGE may be used for genotyping or genetic fingerprinting. It has commonly been considered a gold standard in epidemiological studies of pathogenic organisms for several decades. For instance, subtyping bacterial isolates with this method has made it easier to discriminate among strains of Listeria monocytogenes, Lactococcus garvieae and some clinical isolates of Bacillus cereus  group isolated from diseases aquatic organisms and thus to link environmental or food isolates with clinical infections. It is now in the process of being superseded by next generation sequencing methods. So that Pulsed Field Gel Electrophoresis (PFGE) is a powerful technique used for analyzing bacterial genomes when traditional genetic methods fall short. It is particularly useful for creating structural maps of various bacterial genomes by breaking them down into large chunks using restriction enzymes. These chunks are then separated and segregated, allowing for a detailed analysis of the genome. In other words, PFGE is an advanced technique that enables scientists to gain a deeper understanding of bacterial genomes, even when faced with difficult or complex questions. It has become a popular method for understanding the structure of bacterial genomes and can provide valuable insights into their behavior and characteristics. In summary, PFGE is a highly effective method for analyzing bacterial genomes that allows for a detailed and in-depth understanding of their structure and behavior.

PFGE in Clinical Microbiology 
Pulsed-field gel electrophoresis (PFGE) is a powerful technique that is widely used in clinical microbiology for the characterization and identification of bacterial pathogens. This method is particularly useful for the typing of bacterial isolates from clinical specimens, such as blood, urine, and wound swabs. The ability of PFGE to separate large DNA fragments, often greater than 100 kb, allows for a high level of resolution and discriminatory power.

One of the most important applications of PFGE in clinical microbiology is in the identification and tracking of nosocomial infections, particularly those caused by multidrug-resistant bacteria. For example, PFGE has been used to identify outbreaks of methicillin-resistant Staphylococcus aureus (MRSA) in hospitals and long-term care facilities.  It has also been used to track the spread of vancomycin-resistant Enterococcus (VRE) and multidrug-resistant Acinetobacter baumannii

In addition, PFGE has been used to monitor the emergence of antibiotic resistance among bacterial pathogens. For example, it has been used to track the spread of plasmid-mediated antibiotic resistance among Escherichia coli and Klebsiella pneumoniae.

Finally, PFGE is also used in the characterization of bacterial pathogens associated with foodborne illness. For example, it has been used to identify outbreaks of Salmonella and Listeria monocytogenes associated with contaminated food products.

In conclusion, Pulsed-field gel electrophoresis (PFGE) is a powerful technique that is widely used in clinical microbiology for the characterization and identification of bacterial pathogens, especially in nosocomial infections, emergence of antibiotic resistance, and foodborne illness.

See also
 Gel electrophoresis
 Nonlinear frictiophoresis

References

External links
Pulse field method
Applied Maths BioNumerics PFGE typing

Biological techniques and tools
Electrophoresis
Genetics techniques
Molecular biology